Sherman County (standard abbreviation: SH) is a county located in the U.S. state of Kansas. As of the 2020 census, the county population was 5,927. Its county seat is Goodland. Sherman County was created by the Legislature of 1873, and named after General William Tecumseh Sherman.

History

Early history

For many millennia, the Great Plains of North America was inhabited by nomadic Native Americans.  From the 16th century to 18th century, the Kingdom of France claimed ownership of large parts of North America.  In 1762, after the French and Indian War, France secretly ceded New France to Spain, per the Treaty of Fontainebleau.

19th century
In 1802, Spain returned most of the land to France, but keeping title to about 7,500 square miles.  In 1803, most of the land for modern day Kansas was acquired by the United States from France as part of the 828,000 square mile Louisiana Purchase for 2.83 cents per acre.

In 1854, the Kansas Territory was organized, then in 1861 Kansas became the 34th U.S. state.  In 1886, Sherman County was established.

Geography

Sherman County is one of only four Kansas counties to observe Mountain Time. Since Sherman County is part of the Wichita media market and the local broadcast stations are repeat signals of Wichita affiliates, prime-time programming in the county is aired from 6 to 9 p.m. local time, rather than 7 to 10 p.m. as is normal in the Central and Mountain time zones. However, cable providers carry the ABC and NBC affiliates from both Wichita and Denver, affording viewers the opportunity to view programs on those networks at the normal prime-time hours.

Adjacent counties
 Cheyenne County (north/Central Time border)
 Rawlins County (northeast/Central Time border)
 Thomas County (east/Central Time border)
 Logan County (southeast/Central Time border)
 Wallace County (south)
 Kit Carson County, Colorado (west)

Major highways
  Interstate 70
  US-24
  K-27

Demographics

As of the census of 2000, there were 6,760 people, 2,758 households, and 1,781 families residing in the county.  The population density was 6 people per square mile (2/km2).  There were 3,184 housing units at an average density of 3 per square mile (1/km2).  The racial makeup of the county was 93.83% White, 0.36% Black or African American, 0.33% Native American, 0.19% Asian, 0.16% Pacific Islander, 4.14% from other races, and 0.99% from two or more races.  8.45% of the population were Hispanic or Latino of any race.

There were 2,758 households, out of which 29.20% had children under the age of 18 living with them, 55.80% were married couples living together, 6.00% had a female householder with no husband present, and 35.40% were non-families. 29.20% of all households were made up of individuals, and 14.40% had someone living alone who was 65 years of age or older.  The average household size was 2.40 and the average family size was 3.00.

In the county, the population was spread out, with 24.60% under the age of 18, 11.80% from 18 to 24, 23.90% from 25 to 44, 22.80% from 45 to 64, and 17.10% who were 65 years of age or older.  The median age was 38 years. For every 100 females there were 104.50 males.  For every 100 females age 18 and over, there were 101.40 males.

The median income for a household in the county was $32,684, and the median income for a family was $38,824. Males had a median income of $28,012 versus $20,927 for females. The per capita income for the county was $16,761.  About 9.70% of families and 12.90% of the population were below the poverty line, including 16.90% of those under age 18 and 7.30% of those age 65 or over.

Government
Sherman county is often carried by Republican Candidates, as like the majority of rural counties. However, Lyndon B. Johnson narrowly carried the county in 1964.

Presidential elections

Laws
Sherman County was a prohibition, or "dry", county until the Kansas Constitution was amended in 1986 and voters approved the sale of alcoholic liquor by the individual drink with a 30 percent food sales requirement.

Education

Colleges
 Northwest Kansas Technical College

Unified school districts
 Brewster USD 314
 Goodland USD 352

Communities

Cities
 Goodland
 Kanorado

Unincorporated communities
† means a Census-Designated Place (CDP) by the United States Census Bureau.
 Caruso
 Edson†
 Ruleton

Townships
Sherman County is divided into thirteen townships.  The city of Goodland is considered governmentally independent and is excluded from the census figures for the townships. Geographically, Goodland is located at the juncture of Voltaire, Itasca, and Logan Townships. In the following table, the population center is the largest city (or cities) included in that township's population total, if it is of a significant size.

See also

References

Further reading

 Standard Atlas of Sherman County, Kansas; Geo. A. Ogle & Co; 61 pages; 1907.

External links

County
 
 Sherman County - Directory of Public Officials
Maps
 Sherman County Maps: Current, Historic, KDOT
 Kansas Highway Maps: Current, Historic, KDOT
 Kansas Railroad Maps: Current, 1996, 1915, KDOT and Kansas Historical Society

 
Kansas counties
1886 establishments in Kansas
Populated places established in 1886